Muskegon is an unincorporated community in Scott County, in the U.S. state of Mississippi.

History
The community's name is a transfer from Muskegon, Michigan.

References

Unincorporated communities in Mississippi
Unincorporated communities in Scott County, Mississippi
Mississippi placenames of Native American origin